The Jordan national badminton team represents Jordan in international badminton team competitions. It is organized by the Jordan Badminton Federation, which is the governing body for badminton in Jordan. Jordan competed in the Badminton Asia Championships.

The Jordanian junior team also competed at the 2011 Asian Junior Badminton Championships. The team were eliminated in the group stages.

Participation in Badminton Asia competitions 

Mixed team U19

Participation in Pan Arab Games 

Men's team

Women's team

Current squad 

Men
Bahaedeen Ahmad Alshannik
Ayham Abdul Eleddin
Izzeldeen Abuarrah
Mohd Naser Mansour Nayef
Baha'aldeen Rateb Jallod
Bani Mustafa Hasan Ali
Amro Nidal Alnoubani
Wa'el Mohammad Amro

Women
Domou Amro
Yasmine Hammoudeh
Marah Omar
Samin Abedkhojaseth
Sham Al-Kalili
Haneen Derar Al-Wedyan
Mazahreh Leila Fehmi
Dania Mozher Alkalili

References 

Badminton
National badminton teams
Badminton in Jordan